Krzysztof Sujka (born 19 October 1955) is a Polish former cyclist. He competed at the 1976 Summer Olympics and the 1980 Summer Olympics.

References

External links
 

1955 births
Living people
Polish male cyclists
Olympic cyclists of Poland
Cyclists at the 1976 Summer Olympics
Cyclists at the 1980 Summer Olympics
People from Pabianice
Sportspeople from Łódź Voivodeship